Dima Kandalaft (born 3 January 1979 in Damascus) is a Syrian actress and singer.

Biography
Kandalaft was born in Damascus to a doctor father and a Lebanese mother from Marjayoun.

She graduated with a degree of economics from Damascus University. She pursued an acting career and studied at the Higher Institute for Dramatic Arts. One of her most prominent roles was a role in Bab al-Hara.

On 30 May 2015, Kandalaft married Humam Al Jazaeri, a former Minister of Economy and Foreign Trade.

References

1979 births
Living people
Syrian Christians
Syrian television actresses
21st-century Syrian women singers
People from Damascus
Damascus University alumni
Higher Institute of Dramatic Arts (Damascus) alumni
21st-century Syrian actresses
Syrian people of Lebanese descent